Ben-Zion "Ben" Glatzer (born 8 October 1959, Perth) is an Australian sound engineer and producer. He worked on Ammonia's debut album, Mint 400 (1995), The Chevelles' At Second Glance (1995), Cartman's debut Go! (2002), The Stems' Mushroom Soup: The Citadel Years (2003), and The Sleepy Jackson's debut Lovers (2003). From 1994 to 2002 Glatzer won a total of eight West Australian Music Industry Awards for his work.

Biography
Ben-Zion Glatzer was born on 8 October 1959 in Subiaco. He grew up with his father, Willy (Bill) Glatzer (born 19 December 1927, Poland), a Holocaust survivor and furniture business operator, his mother, Leah Freidman, and his older sister, Hanya Glatzer (later Moschner). Glatzer grew up in the northern suburbs of Perth, he attended Carmel Primary School and Mount Lawley High School. After graduating in 1976 he was accepted into the Western Australian College of Advanced Education (WACAE), where he followed Hanya into an education course. By 1977 he obtained a deferral from further studies and became a factory hand in his family's business.

In April 1977 Glatzer began pursuing a career in music initially as a drummer and as a technical sound engineer. Glatzer's early work was as a live audio engineer for various musical artists including local, interstate and international acts. In 1979 he founded a related sound system and truck hire company, Glatzer Concert Tours. In 1990 he worked at Pet Rock Studios as a record producer and engineer.

In April 1991 Glatzer established the Revolver Sound Studio, where he remained the manager, principal audio engineer and record producer until his partial retirement in May 2006. In mid-2002, Glatzer began production for the rock group, Spencer Tracy's debut self-titled album. Glatzer urged their lead guitarist and vocalist, Lee Jones, to continue his career in rock music when Jones was tempted by an offer to become a classical music pianist. Jones remained with the band and the album was issued in 2003 on Embryo Records.

Personal life
Ben Glatzer's son Jason Glatzer is a musician who, in 2002, formed a school band which became the Perth-based pop rock group Amberdown. By mid-2011 they were recording a five-track EP with the senior Glatzer producing.

Career summary
 April 1977 – May 1992: Various Musical Groups – Live audio engineer. Engineered for many local, interstate and international artists.
 1979–1987: Owned and operated a medium-sized concert sound system and truck hire company: Glatzer Concert Tours.
 February 1990 – May 1991: Petrock Studios – Recording Audio Engineer/Producer
 April 1991 – May 2006: Revolver Sound Studio – Recording Audio Engineer/Producer/Manager

Discography
Ben Glatzer has been credited as producer, mixing engineer, audio engineer, or remixer:
 Ammonia – Mint 400 (1995) – producer
 The Chevelles – At Second Glance (1995) – mixing & audio engineer
 DM3 – Something Heavy (Citadel Records EP, 1995) Road to Rome (Citadel Records, 1996)
 Thumb – Thumb (EP, 1995)
 Sugarchild – Sugarchild (EP, 1997)
 Crawlspace – Afraid (EP, 1998), Motion (1999)
 Wax Tadpole – Proxy by Proxy (EP, 1998)
 Cartman – I'm Not a Policeman (EP, 1999), Nobody (EP, 2000), Go! (2002), George (EP, 2002) – mixing & audio engineer, producer
 Beaverloop – Resistance Is Useful (Murmur Records, 1999)
 Flavour of the Month – Fear of Falling (2000) – audio engineer & co-producer
 The Stems – Mushroom Soup: The Citadel Years (2003) – remixing
 The Sleepy Jackson – Lovers (2003) – audio engineer
 Spencer Tracy – Spencer Tracy (2003)
 Mr Sandman – Highway Love (EP, 2003)
 Showbag – Town We Loved In (2004) – audio engineer

Awards and nominations

WAMI Awards
The West Australian Music Industry Awards (WAMIs) are annual awards presented to the local contemporary music industry, put on by the Western Australian Music Industry Association Inc. Glatzer won a total of eight WAMIs for his work.

|-
| 1992 || Ben Glatzer || Best Live Sound Engineer || 
|-
|rowspan="2"| 1993 || "Foolish" – DM3 || Best Single || 
|-
| Ben Glatzer || Best Sound Recording Engineer || 
|-
| 1994 || Ben Glatzer || Best Sound Recording Engineer || 
|-
| 1995 || Ben Glatzer || Best Sound Recording Engineer || 
|-
| 1996 || Ben Glatzer || Best Sound Recording Engineer || 
|-
|rowspan="2"| 1997 || Ben Glatzer || Best Sound Recording Engineer || 
|-
| Ben Glatzer || Best Record Producer || 
|-
|rowspan="2"| 1998 || Ben Glatzer || Best Sound Recording Engineer || 
|-
| Ben Glatzer || Best Record Producer || 
|-
|rowspan="2"| 1999 || Ben Glatzer || Best Sound Recording Engineer || 
|-
| Ben Glatzer || Best Record Producer || 
|-
|rowspan="2"| 2000 || Ben Glatzer || Best Sound Recording Engineer || 
|-
| Ben Glatzer || Best Record Producer || 
|-
|rowspan="2"| 2001 || Ben Glatzer || Best Sound Recording Engineer  || 
|-
| Ben Glatzer || Best Record Producer || 
|-
| rowspan="2"| 2002 || Ben Glatzer || Best Sound Recording Engineer || 
|-
| Ben Glatzer || Best Record Producer || 
|-
| rowspan="2"| 2003 || Ben Glatzer || Best Sound Recording Engineer || 
|-
| Ben Glatzer || Best Record Producer || 
|-

Other awards
1999		Nominated Best independent release for Crawlspace's "Away" ARIA Music Awards.
2002	        Won Simon McCarthy – "Libertine", Nominated USA Song writing Competition in the Pop & Rock category.

References

External links 
  Revolver Sound Studios, profile of Glatzer

1959 births
Living people
Australian audio engineers
Australian Jews
Australian people of Polish-Jewish descent
Australian record producers
People educated at Mount Lawley Senior High School
Musicians from Perth, Western Australia